The 2020–21 season is Swindon Town's 142nd season in their history and their first season back in League One after being promoted as League Two champions following the 2019–20 season. Along with League One, the club also participates in the FA Cup, EFL Trophy and the EFL Cup.

The season covers the period from 1 July 2020 through to 30 June 2021.

Transfers

Transfers in

Loans in

Loans out

Transfers out

Pre-season

Competitions

EFL League One

League table

Results summary

Results by matchday

Matches
The 2020–21 season fixtures were released on 21 August.

FA Cup

The draw for the first round was made on Monday 26, October.

EFL Cup

The first round draw was made on 18 August .

EFL Trophy

The regional group stage draw was confirmed on 18 August.

References

Swindon Town F.C. seasons
Swindon Town